Muthuvara is an Indian village in the Thrissur district of Kerala.

References

Villages in Thrissur district